Nandhini may refer to:
Nandhini (film), 1997 Tamil film
Nandini (TV series), 2017-2018
Nandhini (anti-liquor-activist)
Arunaa Nandhini, Tamil novelist